Danna, was a Palestinian village 13 kilometres north of Baysan that was captured by the Israel Defense Forces during the 1948 Arab-Israeli war, and the villagers were expelled.

History

Byzantine period
A basalt lintel decorated with a menorah bas-relief, dated to the 5th-6th century and discovered at Kafr Danna, is possibly the only remaining element of a Byzantine synagogue once standing there.

Ottoman period
In 1596, Danna was part of the Ottoman Empire, nahiya (subdistrict) of Shafa under the liwa' (district) of Lajjun with a population of 5 Muslim families, (estimated 28 people). It paid a fixed tax rate of 25% to the Ottoman government on a number of crops, including wheat and barley, and other types of produce, such as goats and beehives; a total of 3,500 akçe.

Johann Ludwig Burckhardt, a Swiss traveler to Palestine who passed through the area around 1817, mentioned the village without providing a description.

In 1838, Denna was noted as part of the Jenin District.

Victor Guérin described  in 1875  the village as being "humble", and situated on a hill. He noted that it had once been much larger, as north of the village centre were ruins of houses.  In 1882, the PEF's Survey of Western Palestine described  Danna as being  situated on a slope, and  surrounded by farmland. There was a spring with a watering trough to the west. The village houses were built of stone and adobe.

British Mandate era
In  the 1922 census of Palestine, conducted by the Mandatory Palestine authorities,  Danna had a population of 176 Muslims, decreasing in the  1931 census   to 149, still all  Muslims, in 28  houses.

The village was shaped like a rectangle whose longer sides were aligned in a north–south direction. During this era the village expanded and new houses, constructed of stone and adobe brick, were built along the road to the nearby village of Kafra. It was classified  as a hamlet in the Palestine Index Gazetteer. There were a few shops and a mosque which contained the maqam (shrine) of a Shaykh Daniyal. The village spring provided water for all the residents. The villagers worked primarily in rainfed agriculture. 

In the 1945 statistics  Danna had a population of 190 Muslims, with a total of 6,614 dunams of land. Of this, a total of 5,097 dunams was used for cereals; 14 dunams were irrigated or used for orchards, while 15 were built-up (urban) land.  Grass and leafy vegetation grew on the slopes and peaks of the neighboring mountains and were used for grazing.

1948, aftermath
On the 28 May 1948  the village was occupied  by Israeli forces, and the villagers were expelled.

According to the Palestinian historian Walid Khalidi, 1992, the remaining structures on the village land were: "Bushes, cactus plants, thorns, and grass now grow around piles of rubble on the village site. Thick weeds grow in the wadi and near the springs. The lands in the area are cultivated by Israeli farmers."

See also
Depopulated Palestinian locations in Israel

References

Bibliography

External links
Welcome To Danna
Danna,  Zochrot
Survey of Western Palestine, map 9:   IAA, Wikimedia commons
Danna, from the Khalil Sakakini Cultural Center

Arab villages depopulated during the 1948 Arab–Israeli War
District of Baysan